XHTEJ-FM is a noncommercial radio station in Tejupilco de Hidalgo, State of Mexico. Broadcasting on 88.3 FM, XHTEJ is owned by Roberto Rodríguez Gómez and is known as Radio Roca.

History
XHTEJ received its permit on October 8, 2012.

References

Radio stations in the State of Mexico